Egyptian Arts Group is a production and distribution company operating business in the Middle East and North Africa and seeks to go worldwide.

Establishment

Egyptian Arts Group was established with the participation of Core Production and Switch Production. Acquired expertise of the two companies, Egyptian Arts Group aims to produce different offering of TV and film market in terms of production quality, and the first production was Bab El Khalk, broadcast on most popular channels like CBC, Al Mehwar, Dream 2, Bab El Khalk is considered Mahmoud Abdel Aziz's return after 8 years since his last successful TV series “Mahmoud Al Masry”.

Founders

Mohamed Mahmoud Abdel Aziz, is representative of the company core of artistic production in Egyptian Arts Group and chairman of the board of directors of core artistic production. He is also a representative of the younger generation was represented by many film and television successful roles and began working as assistant director in some programs and works of art, and has considerable experience in the field of advertising and organizing concerts in Egypt.

Remon Magar is a representative of the company headquarters Switch of artistic production in Egyptian Arts Group, and managing director of Switch artistic production and managing director of the company 4P'S and propaganda Arab Organization for Industrialization.

Elhamy Magar is Switch CEO and a partner He as the family business Starter and founder with the support of the three brothers together Elhamy Magar,Shady Magar and Remon Magar witch grow the business as switch Company and other and made there companies became well stablished and Markable in the Arab world Media markets.

Productions

External links
 Egyptian Arts Group on Imdb
Egyptian Arts Group Official website
Bab Al Khalk TV Series on imdb
Remon Magar on imdb
Mohamed Mahmoud Abdel Aziz on imdb

References 

2009 establishments in Egypt
Film production companies of Egypt
Television in Egypt
Mass media companies established in 2009
Mass media companies of Egypt